Sudin alias Ramkrishna Madhav Dhavalikar is an Indian politician from the state of Goa, and a senior leader of the MG Party. He is a six-term member of the Goa Legislative Assembly, representing the Marcaim constituency and former deputy CM of Goa.

Ministry Portfolios
He has been a Minister in various governments for over 15 years, holding important portfolios by forming alliances with various political parties.

On 27 March 2019, he was dropped from the Cabinet of Ministers as the Deputy Chief Minister, as well as the ruling alliance, after two MGP MLAs (Deepak Pauskar and Manohar Ajgaonkar) broke away from the party and joined the ruling BJP, merging the MGP legislative party into the BJP. A disqualification plea of the two breakaway MGP MLAs, along with 10 other congress MLAs was dismissed by the High Court of Bombay at Goa.

Political party
He is a senior leader of the Maharashtrawadi Gomantak Party, Goa's first ruling party after the end of Portuguese colonial rule in 1961. He has played a pivotal role in survival and success of the party for last 20 years.

Controversy
In 2015, two members of Aam Aadmi Party – Pradip Ghadi Amonkar and Mujahid Rizvi – alleged that Dhavalikar, while contesting the previous Assembly election, had sworn a false affidavit that he is a BSc graduate. They claimed that Sudin Dhavalikar had lied in his sworn affidavit regarding his educational qualification. The aggrieved approached the court as they claimed that Ponda police had declined to register an FIR against Dhavalikar. After inquiring with the Bombay University, Ponda police submitted in the court that Dhavalikar's BSc degree is genuine. The Ponda court promptly dismissed the case noting that JMFC Apurva Nagvekar did not find any merit in the application made by the aggrieved party.

References

External links 
 Goa council of ministers

Living people
1956 births
Goa politicians
Maharashtrawadi Gomantak Party politicians
People from North Goa district
Goa MLAs 2017–2022
Goa MLAs 2022–2027